The Roman Catholic Diocese of Drohiczyn is a diocese located in the city of Drohiczyn in the Ecclesiastical province of Białystok in Poland.

History
 June 5, 1991: Established as Diocese of Drohiczyn from the Diocese of Pinsk in Belarus

Special churches
Cathedral:
 Katedra Trójcy Przenajświętszej, Drohiczyn  (Cathedral of the Most Holy Trinity)
 Konkatedra Niepokalanego Serca NMP, Sokołów Podlaski   (Co-Cathedral of the Immaculate Heart of Mary)
Minor Basilicas:
 Bazylika pw. Narodzenia Najświętszej Maryi Panny i św. Mikołaja, Bielsk Podlaski (Basilica of the Nativity of the Blessed Virgin Mary and St. Nicholas)
 Bazylika Wniebowzięcia Najświętszej Marii Panny, Węgrów (Basilica of the Assumption of the Blessed Virgin Mary)

Leadership
Bishops of Drohiczyn (Roman rite)
 Bishop Władysław Jędruszuk (1991.06.05 – 1994.05.25)
 Bishop Antoni Pacyfik Dydycz, O.F.M. Cap. (1994.06.20 – 2014.03.29)
 Bishop Tadeusz Pikus (2014.05.25 – 2019.07.20)
 Bishop Piotr Sawczuk (from 2019.07.20)

See also
Roman Catholicism in Poland

Sources
 GCatholic.org
 Catholic Hierarchy
  Diocese website

Roman Catholic dioceses in Poland
Roman Catholic dioceses established in 1991
1991 establishments in Poland